STS 71 is a fossilized skull of the species Australopithecus africanus. It was discovered in Sterkfontein, South Africa by Robert Broom in 1947. In 1972 John Wallace connected STS 71 with STS 36, a lower jaw found in the same layer, by matching the wear patterns on the teeth.

It is estimated to be 2.5 million years old.

Its characteristics include a smaller cranium and facial features than other female Australopithecines finds yet the size of the teeth indicate this specimen to be male. The face shows forward projection and the position of the temporal lines high on the cranium indicate large chewing muscles. The brain is 428cc.

See also
 List of human fossils
 List of fossil sites (with link directory)
 List of hominina (hominid) fossils (with images)

References

External links
 Metadata of STS 71 on NESPOS

Australopithecus fossils
Archaeological discoveries in South Africa
1947 archaeological discoveries
Archaeology of Southern Africa